The Beica (Hungarian: Birka-patak, meaning "Sheep Creek" ) is a small river in the Gurghiu Mountains, Mureș County, northern Romania. It is a left tributary of the river Mureș. It flows through the municipalities of Beica de Jos and Petelea, and joins the Mureș near the village Petelea. It is fed by several smaller streams, including Urisiu and Nadășa.

References

Rivers of Romania
Rivers of Mureș County